Derrike Cope Racing with JP Motorsports (formerly known as Creation-Cope Racing, CFK Motorsports, Stratus Racing Group, Cope/Keller Racing and Derrike Cope, Inc, and Quest Motor Racing) was an American professional stock car racing team that competed in the NASCAR Xfinity Series. The team was owned by Derrike Cope, and the team  fielded the No. 70 Chevrolet Camaro in the Xfinity Series for Cope. The team closed before the start of the 2017 season.

Organizational changes
The team originally opened as Quest Motor Racing in 2001. Cope was the team's driver. During the 2003 Winston Cup season, the 37 Chevrolet attempted majority of the seasons 36 races, but only made 18. The team was sponsored by Friendly's Ice Cream. For 2004, Cope and team were to return with new sponsorship from Paramount Hospitality Management LLC (PHM). But before Speedweeks, PHM backed off, leaving Cope heavily underfunded again. Cope and team were approached by Florida businessman Don Arnold and his team, Arnold Motorsports, for a merger. Cope had attempted the 2003 finale at Homestead, but failed to qualify. The merger consisted of the 79 and 37 teams merging to create the No. 50 Arnold Motorsports Dodge. The team used Cope's 2003 Owner Points, to ensure a better chance of making races, as well as Cope's equipment. Cope successfully made the Daytona 500, but crashed and finished 30th. A few weeks later at Darlington, Cope qualified 5th, ran up front the majority of the race, but a pit road issue relegated the team to a 25th-place finish. After the Coca-Cola 600, Cope and Arnold Split, with Cope taking his equipment away from the team, but leaving Arnold with the points. The team made two attempts in 2008 in Cup, rebranded as Cope/Keller Racing, DNQ'ing in both. The team also ran a partial Nationwide schedule, fielding cars for several drivers. The team returned part-time in 2009 with sponsorship from Blu Frog Energy and Flip'n Bags.com.
On December 14, 2009, Cope and Keller partnered with Dale Clemons to form Stratus Racing Group in the ARCA, Nationwide, Truck, and Cup Series. The team will field cars in all levels in 2010 including two ARCA teams and Nationwide and Truck teams. The Sprint Cup effort will be part-time in 2010 but it will increase in 2011.

In the Truck Series, Cope and nieces Angela and Amber Cope will run limited schedules. The sisters made their first starts in 2010 in the Truck Series at Martinsville. Angela ran the No. 01 Odyssey Batteries Dodge Ram and Amber in the No. 6 Dodge Ram with the same sponsors. Angela finished 30th and Amber 26th.

History
The team originally opened in 2001 with Derrike Cope driving the No. 37 K&N Filters Pontiac, but never made a race. The team returned in 2002, this time running the Ford Taurus. In 2003, the team planned to attempt all 36 races in the No. 37 Friendly's Ice Cream Chevrolet.
Stratus Racing Group was previously called Cope/Keller Racing and Derrike Cope Inc. in Nationwide.

In the past, Stratus has fielded trucks in the Camping World Truck Series. Larry Foyt and Jennifer Jo Cobb has each ran one race for the team in 2009.

The team also fields two cars in the NASCAR Nationwide Series under the name of Derrike Cope Inc. In 2009, the team has run the No. 73 and No. 78 cars for Cope, Kevin Lepage, and Chase Miller. The team also attempted to run a third car, No. 79, at Kansas Speedway for Jennifer Jo Cobb. The team missed the race, in fact only Lepage's car qualified out of the three. Former drivers for this effort include Larry Gunselman, Kertus Davis, Jason White, and Johnny Sauter.

2010
Stratus will be sponsored by Connectyx Technologies Holdings Group Inc for the select Nationwide and Truck races in 2010. The drivers will be Derrike Cope (Nationwide) as well as Angela and Amber Cope in the Truck Series.

In their first competition of the season. Derrike Cope finished 24th in the Bud Shootout.

2011
Derrike Cope and Stratus Racing entered the 2011 Goodys Fast Relief 500 at Martinsville, but withdrew on Thursday before practice on Friday. Derrike will not run the No. 73 Dodge Challenger in the Nationwide Series.  Cope also is entered in the Showtime Southern 500 at Darlington. Cope has changed manufacturers from Dodge Charger to Chevrolet Impala. He was forced to withdraw from Darlington when the engine in his MAXcellence Chevrolet was tested on an engine dyno and determined to not have enough power to make the race. Cope hoped to be ready for the Sprint Showdown. When problems again plagued the team, Cope went to race for Max Q Motorsports in the 64. During the showdown race, Landon Cassill blew a tire and spun in front of Cope's Ford, causing Cope to T-bone the side of Cassill's car. Neither driver was injured.

2012
For the 2012 season, Cope changed the name of the team to CFK Motorsports. The team attempted the NNS Daytona race, but failed to make the show. Cope is also running for Robinson-Blakeney Racing. Cope also planned to enter 5-7 races in the Sprint Cup Series. Cope once again attempted to qualify at Bristol Motor Speedway, but was knocked out due to being slowest in practice and qualifying. Cope and CFK Motorsports finally made their first race in the 32nd race of the season. Cope started 36th and finished 28th.

2013
CFK returned for a part-time schedule in 2013 under the moniker of Creation-Cope Racing in a Chevy with sponsorship from MAXallence Energy. The team attempted several races with driver Derrike Cope, and only make one with Cope, a race in which they start and parked. They also ran the Mid-Ohio race with Alx Danielsson and dropped out due to a mechanical failure after 35 laps.

2014
Derrike Cope Racing competed full-time in the 2014 NASCAR Nationwide Series season, driving the No. 70 Chevrolet Camaro. Cope purchased all assets from the former ML Motorsports for the 2014 season.  The team tested at Daytona in January, at the annual Daytona testing event. In February, the team went to Daytona International Speedway and qualified for the Drive for COPD 300, finishing in the 37th position after some difficulties.  Charlies Soap continued to sponsor the car through round number four of the season at Bristol, where Derrike finished P28.  In the following race at Auto Club Speedway, the team was sponsored by Youtheory.  Youtheory continued to sponsor the car full-time until the final Texas race of the season.  Charlies Soap came on board in the final Charlotte race as well.  Derrike finished P13 at the Firecracker 300 at Daytona in the Summer, which ended up being his best finish of the year.  Derrike ended the year P23 in the Xfinity Series standings.

2015
The same plans are in place for 2015, with sponsorship from Charlie's Soap.  2015 was not a good season for the 70 team.  The team missed the first race of the season and was plagued with several problems in the following weeks. During the California race weekend, Cope's team hauler was surrounded by African Swarm Bees. Sponsorship problems also plagued the team.  Cope's next DNQ came at Talladega when his car was not fast enough to make the field. Cope had originally missed the July 4th race at Daytona, but the 13 MBM Motorsports car driven by Mark Thompson was found to be illegal. Thompson, who originally qualified 32nd, was wiped from the field and his spot was given to Cope. The team also ran with younger drivers who had brought sponsor dollars along. The team finished 37th in owner points.

2016
Cope announced at the end of the 2015 season that he would again run the full schedule in 2016, in a partnership with JP Motorsports. Sponsorship for Daytona was revealed as Ice-Aid.  They would serve as primary sponsor for Daytona and associate sponsor throughout the season. The team DNQ'd at Daytona. In Atlanta, the team finished 27th with Adrenalin Powersports and Ice-Aid on board. The following week in Las Vegas, with E-hydrate and Ice-Aid on the car, the team wrecked the primary in practice. They got the back up car ready, but unfortunately cleared tech just after the qualifying session ended and did not qualify. Timmy Hill was hired to drive two road courses: Mid-Ohio and Road America. Dexter Stacey drove the car in the last 3 races of season.

2017
The team announced via Facebook that they would not be returning for the 2017 NASCAR season. Cope would return part-time to the Cup series for Premium Motorsports, and later take a managerial role at the newly formed StarCom Racing, along with driving duties.

Motorsports career results

NASCAR
(key) (Bold – Pole position awarded by qualifying time. Italics – Pole position earned by points standings or practice time. * – Most laps led.)

Sprint Cup Series (primary entry)

Winston Cup Series (secondary entry)

Xfinity Series (primary entry)

Nationwide Series (secondary entry)

Camping World Truck Series (primary entry)

Camping World Truck Series (secondary entry)

Footnotes

References

External links
 
 Cope/Keller Racing official website
 Stratus Racing Group

Defunct NASCAR teams
Auto racing teams disestablished in 2017